Sinogastromyzon nantaiensis is a species of hillstream loach (a ray-finned fish) in the genus Sinogastromyzon. It is endemic to Taiwan. It is found in the Kaoping and Tsengwen River basins in the southern Taiwan.

Sources

Sinogastromyzon
Endemic fauna of Taiwan
Freshwater fish of Taiwan
Taxa named by Chen I-Shiung
Taxa named by Han Chiao-Chuan 
Taxa named by Fang Lee-Shing
Fish described in 2002